Gunungia capitirecava is a species of snout moth in the genus Gunungia. It was described by Ying-Dang Ren and Hou-Hun Li in 2007 and is known from China.

References

Moths described in 2007
Phycitinae